Natalia Yakushenko (born March 2, 1972) is a Soviet-Ukrainian luger who has competed since 1987. She won two bronze medals at the FIL World Luge Championships (Women's singles: 2009, Mixed team: 1990).

Competing in five Winter Olympics, Yakuchenko earned her best finish of eighth in the women's singles event both in 1992 and 1994.

References
1992 luge women's singles results
1994 luge women's singles results
1998 luge women's singles results
2006 luge women's singles results
FIL-Luge profile
Hickok sports information on World champions in luge and skeleton.

External links
 
 
 

1972 births
Living people
Ukrainian female lugers
Soviet female lugers
Olympic lugers of Ukraine
Olympic lugers of the Unified Team
Lugers at the 1992 Winter Olympics
Lugers at the 1994 Winter Olympics
Lugers at the 1998 Winter Olympics
Lugers at the 2006 Winter Olympics
Lugers at the 2010 Winter Olympics
Sportspeople from Kyiv